Cyrtopodion watsoni, also known commonly as the northern spotted ground gecko, the Pakistani thin-toed gecko, and Watson's gecko, is a species of lizard in the family Gekkonidae. The species is native to South Asia.

Etymology
The specific name, watsoni, is in honor of Lieutenant E.Y. Watson of the Indian army, who collected the holotype.

Geographic range
C. watsoni is endemic to Pakistan.

Reproduction
C. watsoni is oviparous.

References

Further reading
Minton SA (1966). "A Contribution to the Herpetology of West Pakistan". Bulletin of the American Museum of Natural History 134: 29–184. (Cyrtodactylus watsoni, new combination, p. 79).
Murray JA (1892). The Zoology of Beloochistan and Afghanistan. (Reptiles and Batrachia). Bombay: Bombay Education Society Press. 83 pp. (Gymnodactylus watsoni, new species, p. 68).
Smith MA (1935). The Fauna of British India, Including Ceylon and Burma. Reptilia and Amphibia. Vol. II.—Sauria. London: Secretary of State for India in Council. (Taylor and Francis, printers). xiii + 440 pp. + Plate I + 2 maps. (Gymnodactylus kachhensis watsoni, p. 44).

Cyrtopodion
Reptiles described in 1892
Taxa named by James A. Murray (zoologist)
Reptiles of Pakistan
Reptiles of Afghanistan